Dolakha Newar (endonym Dwālkhā Nepal Bhasa), or Eastern Newar, is a divergent dialect of the Newar language (Nepal Bhasa) spoken in Dolakha District, east of the Kathmandu Valley of Nepal, by 5,645 Newar people as of 1988. Some speakers of Dolakha Newar can be found in Kathmandu for education or work.

Geographical region
Dolakha Newar is spoken in Dolakha town of Dolakha district, Tauthali of Sindupalchowk district, Listi and Duti of Kavre district.

Phonology

Consonants 

 Notes
 Marginal phonemes are in parentheses.
 Allophonic variants are in Square brackets.
 Tap consonants mainly occur as word-medial alternates of //, //, // or // (in Dolakha only).
 // can be heard as [] when occurring before front vowels/glide //.
 Affricates // can also shift to retracted sounds [] when occurring before back vowels.

Vowels 

 // and // can also be heard as [], and [].
 In Dolakha Newar, the back vowel sound can be [], [], or [].
 The following nasal vowels can also be distinguished in vowel length as //.

Diphthongs

Number

References 

Newar language